Yana Vyacheslavovna Kirpichenko (born 22 January 1996) is a Russian cross-country skier who competes internationally.

She competed at the FIS Nordic World Ski Championships 2021 in Oberstdorf, where she won a silver medal in the relay with the Russian team, and placed tenth in the skiathlon.

Cross-country skiing results
All results are sourced from the International Ski Federation (FIS).

World Championships
1 medal – (1 silver)

World Cup

Season standings

Notes

References

External links

1996 births
Living people
Russian female cross-country skiers
Sportspeople from Barnaul
FIS Nordic World Ski Championships medalists in cross-country skiing
Competitors at the 2019 Winter Universiade
Universiade medalists in cross-country skiing
Universiade gold medalists for Russia
Universiade bronze medalists for Russia
Tour de Ski skiers